Fingers Inc. was an American music group from Chicago, Illinois. It consisted of producer Larry Heard and vocalists Robert Owens and Ron Wilson. AllMusic called it the "top early Chicago house group".

History
Fingers Inc. was formed in Chicago, Illinois in 1985 by producer Larry Heard and vocalists Robert Owens and Ron Wilson. In 1988, the group released a studio album, Another Side.

The group did not release the second studio album, in part because Owens relocated to New York City, New York. However, in a 2016 interview, Heard stated that there are some unreleased collaborative songs. He added that he hopes to release these songs through his own record label Alleviated Records.

Discography

Studio albums
 Another Side (1988)

Singles
 "Bring Down the Walls" (1985)
 "A Path" (1986)
 "It's Over" (1986)
 "Mystery of Love" (1986)
 "A Love of My Own" (1987)
 "Distant Planet" (1987)
 "I'm Strong" (1987)
 "Can You Feel It" (1988)
 "So Glad" (1988)
 "Never No More Lonely" (1989)

References

External links
 

American musical trios
Electronic music groups from Illinois
Musical groups from Chicago